Austin Davis may refer to:

 Austin Davis (American football) (born 1989), American football player
 Austin Davis (baseball) (born 1993), American baseball player
 Austin Davis (politician), American politician from Pennsylvania 

